SpiderCloud Wireless  was founded in November 2006 as Evoke Networks by Peter Wexler, Allan Baw, and Mark Gallagher. The trio incubated the company as Copivia Inc. and hired Mike Gallagher as CEO in October 2007. After closing the Series-A funding in January 2008, the company soon changed its name to SpiderCloud Wireless. The company is now headquartered in Milpitas, California. The company is backed by investors Charles River Ventures, Matrix Partners, Opus Capital and Shasta Ventures. It has raised around US$125 million in venture capital and is generating revenue from customers such as Vodafone UK, Vodafone Netherlands, Verizon Wireless, Warid Telecom and more. The company helps mobile operators improve service quality for enterprise customers.

SpiderCloud Wireless develops scalable and multi-access Small Cell network platforms that allow mobile operators to deliver cellular and Wi-Fi coverage, capacity and smart applications to enterprises and venues of any size.

SpiderCloud Wireless was ranked as a top #5 venture-funded company in WSJ's Next Big Thing report in 2012.

SpiderCloud wins first place at the 2013 CTIA E-Tech Award for Network Infrastructure: In-Building Network for "FIRST SCALABLE AND MULTI-ACCESS 3G, WI-FI AND 4G/LTE SMALL CELL SYSTEM"

In 2013, Vodafone Netherlands picks SpiderCloud for enterprise in-building access. 

In Jan 2014, Vodafone UK gives live launch to SpiderCloud's E-RAN solution.

America Movil's Telcel taps SpiderCloud to provide scalable small cell systems for in-building coverage and capacity for its largest government, education and business customers in Mexico.

SpiderCloud wins contract with Verizon Wireless in 2015.

SpiderCloud and Cisco Systems entered into an OEM agreement on March 2, 2015.  

SpiderCloud launches Partner Program in 2016. 

SpiderCloud and NEC entered into a partnership in 2016. 

SpiderCloud and Qualcomm announce partnership for delivery for unlicensed LTE radio products. 

SpiderCloud wins Small Cell Forum's Excellence in Enterprise Deployments for 3rd consecutive year. 

In 2017, Verizon asked all five of its DAS suppliers to integrate with SpiderCloud Wireless. 

Sprint announces decision to deploy SpiderCloud products in 2017.

SpiderCloud named by Mobile Breakthrough as the winner of both the "Overall Wireless Broadband Solution" and "Next-Gen Wi-Fi Operator Deployment of the Year" awards

Verizon deploys $120MM worth of indoor 5G access equipment through Corning / SpiderCloud at So-Fi Stadium for Super Bowl 2022.

SpiderCloud was acquired by Corning Inc. on July 19, 2017. 

SpiderCloud reaps the benefits of acquisition by Corning. 

The acquisition price was pegged in the $200 million to $250 million range.

References 

Mobile technology companies
Companies based in Milpitas, California
Telecommunications companies of the United States